Denver is a small unincorporated community located in rural Harmony Township in Hancock County in the U.S. state of Illinois, about eight miles south of Carthage and about 30 miles northeast of Quincy.

History
Denver was laid out in 1863, and named after Denver, Colorado. A post office was established at Denver in 1863, and remained in operation until 1976.

Geography

Denver is at latitude 40°17'26" north and longitude 91°06'25" west. The ZIP code is 62321 (for Carthage) and the FIPS place code is 19473. The elevation is 672 feet above sea level.

References

External links
NACo

Unincorporated communities in Hancock County, Illinois
Unincorporated communities in Illinois